Linet Kwamboka (born c. 1988), is a Kenyan computer scientist and businesswoman, who serves as the chief executive officer of DataScience Limited, an IT research company that she founded.

Background and education
She was born in Nyamira County, in the western part of Kenya, circa 1988. After attending local schools, she was admitted to the University of Nairobi, graduating in 2008, with a Bachelor of Science degree in Computer Science. She has self-taught expertise in geographic information systems (GIS), data mining and analysis.

Career
After university, for the next six years, she led Kenya's Open Data Initiative, nudging the government to make more information open and publicly available. She has worked with the World Bank on the Open Government Partnership for the Government of Kenya. She also worked as a software engineer with Carnegie Mellon University and Stanford University.

In 2013, at the age of 25 years, Kwamboka founded  DataScience Limited. The company, with 9 employees in 2015, is involved in data analytics and open-source policy issues.

In 2017, Linet Kwamboka was one of the ten first recipients of the "Mozilla Tech Policy Fellowship". The fellowship, awarded and supported by the Mozilla Foundation, aims "to give people with expertise in government and Internet policy the support and structure they need to continue their work in making the Internet healthy".

Other considerations
In August 2018, Linet Kwamboka was named as one of the "100 Most Influential People In Digital Government". The list was compiled by Apolitical, a London, United Kingdom-based non-government global network, which assists public servants find the ideas, people and partners they need to solve the challenges of governing.

See also
 Susan Oguya
 Nana Gecaga
 Sylvia Mulinge
 Emily Orwaru

References

External links

Welcoming 11 New Partners in the Quest for Internet Health As of 19 March 2018.

Living people
1988 births
University of Nairobi alumni
21st-century Kenyan businesswomen
21st-century Kenyan businesspeople
People from Nyamira County
Kenyan women business executives
Kenyan chief executives